The  NBA G League International Challenge was an international professional basketball tournament featuring all-star selections of the NBA G League. Its purpose is to allow players from the National Basketball Association (NBA)'s development league to play games against clubs, league all-star selections, and national teams from around the world.

The games themselves are played under FIBA rules, which differ slightly from the NBA's rules. The basketball court's markings and dimensions also slightly differ.

History
The first NBA G League International Challenge was the 2018 edition. It featured an all-star selection of NBA G League players coached by Jeff Van Gundy, that made up Team USA's 2019 FIBA World Cup Americas qualifiers team at the time, versus the senior men's Mexican national basketball team. Team USA won the game, by a score of 88–67. The 2019 edition of the tournament expanded the format to 6 teams, and was won by the German EuroLeague club Bayern Munich.

There has been no challenge since 2020.

Results

Finals

References

External links
 Official NBA G League website
 2019 NBA G League International Challenge
 2019 NBA G League International Challenge 

International
Recurring sporting events established in 2018